The lacrimose mountain tanager (Anisognathus lacrymosus) is a species of bird in the family Thraupidae. It is found in Andean highland forest from Venezuela, through Colombia and Ecuador, to Peru. Some of its 11 subspecies are quite distinctive and A. l. yariguierum was only scientifically described in 2010.

References

lacrimose mountain tanager
Birds of the Northern Andes
lacrimose mountain tanager
lacrimose mountain tanager
Taxonomy articles created by Polbot